The 1994–95 Penn Quakers men's basketball team represented the University of Pennsylvania during the 1994–95 NCAA Division I men's basketball season. The Quakers, led by 6th-year head coach Fran Dunphy, played their home games at The Palestra as members of the Ivy League. They finished the season 22–6, 14–0 in Ivy League play to win the conference championship. They received the Ivy League's automatic bid to the NCAA tournament where they lost in the First Round to No. 5 seed Alabama.

This was the third of three consecutive 14–0 seasons, and one of five overall in the Dunphy era, in Ivy League play.

Roster

Schedule and results

|-
!colspan=9 style=| Non-conference regular season

|-
!colspan=9 style=| Ivy League regular season

|-
!colspan=9 style=| NCAA tournament

Awards and honors
Matt Maloney – Ivy League Player of the Year

References

Penn Quakers men's basketball seasons
Penn
Penn
Penn
Penn